René Lefèvre (born René Paul Louis Lefèvre; 6 March 1898 – 23 May 1991) was a French actor and writer. Throughout his career, he worked with several notable directors, like Jean Renoir, Jean-Pierre Melville, Jules Dassin, and René Clair.

Career
Lefèvre made his debut in the 1920s when he acted in numerous films in small roles. His first film of note was Le Million, directed by René Clair in 1931. He later had the fortune of starring in the title role in The Crime of Monsieur Lange, directed by Jean Renoir. He kept appearing in films until the late 70s, landing a small role in Jean-Pierre Melville's Le Doulos in 1962. He died in 1991 in Poissy.

Partial filmography

1925: Knock, ou le triomphe de la médecine (de René Hervil) - Jean - le voiturier 
1927: The Marriage of Mademoiselle Beulemans (de Julien Duvivier) - Seraphím Meulemeester
1927: Fleur d'amour (de Marcel Vandal)
1927: Le sous-marin de cristal (de Marcel Vandal) - Comte des Hurlettes
1928: The Maelstrom of Paris (de Julien Duvivier) - Favergé
1928: Nile Water (de Marcel Vandal) - Arthur de Sorgepoix
1928: Not So Stupid (de André Berthomieu)
1929: Un soir au cocktail's bar (de Roger Lion) - Bar clerk
1929: The Ladies in the Green Hats (de André Berthomieu) - Ulysse Hiacinther
1929: Rapacité (de Albert Sauvage) (Short)
1929: Rapacité (de André Berthomieu) - Edmond Chabert
1930: Le Ruisseau (de René Hervil) - Un client
1930: The Road to Paradise (de Wilhelm Thiele et Max de Vaucorbeil) - Jean
1930: Les Deux mondes (de Ewald-Abdré Dupont)
1931: Mon ami Victor (de André Berthomieu) - Victor de Fleury
1931: The Million (de René Clair) - Michel Bouflette
1931: Jean de la Lune (de Jean Choux) - Jean de la Lune
1931: Moon Over Morocco (de Julien Duvivier - Jacques Le Guérantec
1931: On opère sans douleur (de Jean Tarride)
1932: Un chien qui rapporte (de Jean Choux) - René
1932: Monsieur, Madame and Bibi (de Jean Boyer et Max Neufeld) - Monsieur Paul Baumann
1932: Seul (de Jean Tarride) - Eugène Bricot
1932: Orange Blossom (de Henry Roussell) - Raymond de Méricourt
1932: His Best Client (de Pierre Colombier) - Gaston
1932: Buridan's Donkey (de Alexandre Ryder) - Georges
1933: Paprika (de Jean de Limur) - Paul Charvin
1933: La Paix chez soi (de André Hugon) (Short) - Triel
1934: La Femme idéale (de André Berthomieu) - Grégoire Vachette
1934: Les Deux canards (de Erich Schmidt) - Gélidon
1934: L'Amour en cage (de Karel Lamač et Jean de Limur) - Charles
1935: Les Époux scandaleux (de Georges Lacombe) - Jean
1935: Vogue, mon coeur (de Jacques Daroy) - Jim Ashbury
1936: Le pigeon (de Albert Riera) (Short)
1936: Ca n'a pas d'importance de Gaston Didier - court métrage
1936: The Crime of Monsieur Lange (de Jean Renoir) - Amédée Lange
1936: Le coup de trois (de Jean de Limur) - Monsieur Popolka
1936: Feu la mère de madame (de Germain Fried) (Short)
1937: Trois... six... neuf (de Raymond Rouleau) - Pierre
1937: Le gagnant (de Yves Allégret) (Short)
1937: Mes tantes et moi (de Yvan Noé) - Eloi
1937: Le Choc en retour (de Georges Monca et Maurice Kéroul) - Max de Bellecour
1937: Gueule d'amour (de Jean Grémillon) - René
1938: Nights of Princes (de Vladimir Strizhevsky) - Wassili Wronsky
1938: La Piste du sud (de Pierre Billon) - L'instituteur Saillant
1938: Sommes-nous défendus (de Jean Loubignac) - Le journaliste
1939: Place de la Concorde (de Karel Lamač) - Ripotot
1939: Feux de joie (de Jacques Houssin) - Roland
1939: Petite Peste (de Jean de Limur) - Jacques Chantelouve
1940: Musicians of the Sky (de Georges Lacombe) - Victor Barthélémy
1941: Parade en sept nuits (de Marc Allégret) - Uniquement dialoguiste
1942: Opéra-Musette (de René Lefèvre et Claude Renoir) - Lampluche
1942: La Femme que j'ai le plus aimée (de Robert Vernay) - Georges, le fils de l'industriel
1943: À la belle frégate (de Albert Valentin) - Jean
1943: Arlette and Love de Robert Vernay) - Le notaire
1945: Box of Dreams (de Yves Allégret) - Marc
1945: Son dernier rôle (de Jean Gourguet)
1947: Le Bataillon du ciel (de Alexander Esway) - Baptiste - Film tourné en deux époques
1948: La carcasse et le tord-cou (de René Chanas) - Uniquement dialoguiste
1949: Le Point du jour (de Louis Daquin) - Dubard
1949: L'Escadron blanc (de René Chanas) - L'adjudant Devars
1950: Un sourire dans la tempête (de René Chanas) - Uniquement dialoguiste
1951: Under the Sky of Paris (de Julien Duvivier) - Uniquement dialoguiste
1952: Alone in the World (de René Chanas) - François Hermenault
1952: Trois femmes (de André Michel) - M. Cachelin (segment "L'Héritage")
1953: Storms (de Guido Brignone) - Amédée Didier (uncredited)
1955: La Lumière d'en face (de Georges Lacombe) - Walter
1955: Bel Ami (de Louis Daquin) - Le banquier Walter
1957: La Garçonne (de Jacqueline Audry) - Professeur Vignabos
1957: Celui qui doit mourir (de Jules Dassin) - Yannakos
1958: It's All Adam's Fault (de Jacqueline Audry) - Norbert de Cazaubon
1958:Sois belle et tais-toi (de Marc Allégret) - Monsieur Raphael
1958: La liberté surveillée (de Henri Aisner et Vladimír Vlcek) - Benoît
1958: Le Gorille vous salue bien (de Bernard Borderie) - Commissaire Blavet
1959: Douze heures d'horloge (de Geza Radvanyi)
1959: Rue des prairies (de Denys de La Patellière) - Uniquement d'après son roman
1959: Le secret du Chevalier d'Éon (de Jacqueline Audry) - Le comte Antoine d'Éon
1962: Comme un poisson dans l'eau (de André Michel) - M. Dumesnil
1963: Le Doulos (de Jean-Pierre Melville) - Gilbert Varnove
1963: Une blonde comme ça (de Jean Jabely) - Doc
1963: La Foire aux cancres (de Louis Daquin) - L'inspecteur
1964: Un gosse de la butte (de Maurice Delbez) - Monsieur Bosquet
1966: Angelique and the King (de Bernard Borderie) - Colbert
1967: Un homme de trop (de Constantin Costa Gavras) - Colonel Guers
1976: Le Corps de mon ennemi (de Henri Verneuil) - Pierre Leclercq
1977: Un oursin dans la poche (de Pascal Thomas) - Pierre Leclercq

References

External links
 

1898 births
1991 deaths
French male film actors
French male silent film actors
Male actors from Nice, France
20th-century French male actors